Altavoz is an American music distributor which serves independent entertainers, covering a variety of musical genres. A year after the company was founded, it was purchased by investor Nelson Jacobsen and relaunched in Rockville, Maryland.

History
Nelson Jacobsen established Altavoz.com after its acquisition. The website offered downloads of digital sound files (.wav) and fifteen-second introductions to music streams.

By 1999, Altavoz had rolled out merchandise in big box stores such Best Buy and independent retailers nationwide. Their offerings expanded to vinyl records, books and more. By the time of the dot-com crash, Altavoz continued to provide stock to thousands of independent and big box stores and was receiving 1.2 million hits a day on the official website.

In 2011, Jacobsen took a new leadership role in the company as its CEO. In 2013, Altavoz began online presentations for distribution deals exporting US-made music. Part of the incorporation of the company included the non-profit "Help Earth Foundation." On September 25, 2015, Max Media Group, Inc. (MXMI) announced that its board of directors had voted unanimously to transfer a majority of the control of MXMI to Altavoz Entertainment. 

As of late 2017, Jacobsen, a board member of MXMI, continues to lead Altavoz as CEO.

Major project
In collaboration with David Lynch, Altavoz released a limited-edition vinyl box set to benefit the David Lynch Foundation on Record Store Day in 2012. The compilation, Music That Changes the World, features 34 songs from Alanis Morissette, Tom Waits, Amanda Palmer, Ben Folds, Iggy Pop, Maroon 5, Neon Trees and more. The four-LP box set also includes a 42-page color book, custom-made by “Imprint Indie Printing” of N. Venice, Florida. The book, introduced by David Lynch, was illustrated by Nepali artist Romio Shrestha and New Jersey artist Davel Hamue. All songs were re-mastered for this project by Gavin Lurssen.

Exclusive library release (2015)
"Songs of Phillip Carter" was released exclusively to an estimated 120,000 Public Libraries in the USA before being made available to digital and physical outlets. Phillip Carter was the first gospel artist with an exclusive music release to the US Public Library system.

Artists

Argonauts 
Big Mucci
Dawn Richard
Doyle Wolfgang Von Frankenstein
Emily
Julie Doiron
Lady Cam
Phillip Carter
Roy "Future man" Wooten
Sunwolf
Theo Sampel
Tom 
VALIS

Former artists
Jack Mack and the Heart Attack
K Mitch
Love Dominique

Releases

Theo Sampel - Sampel This (2006)
Revival - Horses of War (2007)
Dawn Richard - Golden Heart (2013)
Bella Nae - H.I.G.H. XOXO (2013)
Quinn Sullivan - Getting There (2013)
Various Artist - Drop the Needle: Boston Punk Anthology (2013)
VALIS - Minds through Space and Time (2013)
Doyle Wolfgang von Frankenstein - Abominator (2013) 
Julie Doiron - So Many Days (2013)
Argonauts - Whats Your Perfect Day (2013)
Jack Mack And the Heart Attack* – Lookin’ Up (2013)
Love Dominique* - Love Dominique (2014)
Big Mucci - Shuffle, Step, Slide (2014)
Lady Cam - Get It Got It (2014)
Sunwolf - Angel Eyes (2014)             
Phillip Carter - Songs of Phillip Carter (Exclusive Library Release) ELR
John Bull and The Bandits - Words to the Wise (2015)
K. Mitch* - WDGAF (single)

* Not currently signed.

Billboard chart history
2013:

Dawn Richard CD Goldenheart January 2013 
after leaving Diddy Dirty Money and Danity Kane

Quinn Sullivan - CD Getting There Released May 2013  reached #4 on Billboard Blues Chart. Aug, 24th 2013 

2015:

John Bull and the Bandits, Single "Mr. Bradley" April 9, 2015 #73 Billboard Blues Cart.

References

Companies based in Rockville, Maryland
Record label distributors
Music companies of the United States
American companies established in 1994